Paul Coulthard, BDS, MFGDP(UK), MDS, FDSRCS(Eng), FDSRCS(OS), PhD, FDSRCPS(Glas), FFDTRCS(Ed), FDSRCS(Ed), (born 2 November 1957) is a British Academic who was appointed Professor of Oral and Maxillofacial Surgery at the University of Manchester in 2004.

Career 
Coulthard was appointed Dean of the School of Dentistry at the University of Manchester in 2013. In 2018 he was appointed Vice-Dean of the Faculty of Biology, Medicine and Health at the University of Manchester and Head of the School of Medical Sciences Research. This School consisted of the Research Institutes of ‘Cancer Sciences’, ‘Cardiovascular Sciences’, ‘Developmental Biology & Medicine’, ‘Diabetes, Endocrinology & Gastroenterology’, and the ‘Manchester Medical School’ and ‘Manchester Dental School’.  He was Consultant in Oral Surgery at the Manchester University Hospitals NHS Foundation Trust since 2001.

In 2019 Coulthard moved to Barts & The London School of Medicine and Dentistry, Queen Mary University of London, as Dean & Director of the Institute of Dentistry, and Professor of Oral & Maxillofacial Surgery. He introduced the largest number of virtual reality Haptic Dental Trainers of any school in the world. He was also appointed Honorary Consultant in Oral Surgery at Barts Health NHS Trust, one of the largest NHS Trusts in England.

Coulthard has chaired several committees for NHS England that has published reports changing the delivery of clinical care in England.

Coulthard is Honorary Consultant Advisor to the Office of the Chief Dental Officer, NHS England and NHS Improvement (01.02.2020 to 2023).

Coulthard was President of British Association of Oral Surgeons. 2019-2021.

Research 
Coulthard has been an Editor with the Cochrane Oral Health Group since 2002, Editor-in-Chief of the international scientific journal Oral Surgery 2013-2018 and is on the Editorial Board of the International Journal of Surgery 2002-2018. He has undertaken numerous clinical pain studies developed from his systematic reviews that have investigated intra-operative local analgesia and postoperative systemic analgesic strategies. He designed, validated and introduced the Indicator of Sedation Need (IOSN) tool to support individual clinician decision making and determine population need for clinical service planning. He was principal investigator for international studies showing the benefits of tissue adhesive compared to traditional alternatives such as sutures for the skin closure of long surgical incisions. He is leading research improving the response of healthcare professions to Domestic Violence especially as facial and dental injury. Coulthard has published over 200 scientific papers.

Coulthard together with British Dermatologist Irene Leigh created the ‘Barts Centre for Squamous Cancer’ in 2021 funded by Barts Charity. A centre of excellence dedicated to improving the detection, treatment and quality of life for patients with squamous oral, oesophageal and skin cancer.

Teaching 
The fourth edition of Coulthard’s textbook Oral and Maxillofacial Surgery, Radiology, Pathology and Oral Medicine (Master Dentistry Volume 1) was published 2022, Paul Coulthard, Philip Sloan, Elizabeth Theaker, Anita Sengupta.

Education 
Coulthard was educated at Danum Grammar School, Yorkshire. After undergraduate study at the University of Manchester he undertook General Clinical Training as a General Dental Practitioner in Manchester, Sheffield, and the Kingdom of Saudi Arabia. He then undertook Basic Surgical Training in Manchester, Carlisle and London, and also training in Anaesthesia. He completed his Higher Specialist Surgical Training in Academic Oral and Maxillofacial Surgery in Manchester in 2000. Alongside surgical training, Coulthard undertook research training leading to the award of an MDS in Oral and Maxillofacial Surgery and a PhD in Neuroscience

Personal life 
Coulthard was born in Bishop Auckland, County Durham. In 1993 he married Fiona MacDougall Pearcey with whom he has three children, Matthew Bromley (born March 3, 1993), Francesca Pearcey (born May 11, 1995) and Imogen Darcey Coulthard (born July 7, 1999).

References 

British dentists
1957 births
Living people
British academics